Luís Fernando Peixoto Gonçalves Sobrinho (born 5 May 1961) is a Portuguese retired footballer who played as a central defender.

Club career
Born in Setúbal, Sobrinho started playing professionally with local Vitória F.C. after graduating from the club's youth system. After a solid second season in the Primeira Liga the 21-year-old signed with FC Porto, but failed to appear in any league matches, returning to his previous team after one year.

After two more campaigns with Vitória, Sobrinho joined C.F. Os Belenenses, experiencing some of his best professional years: after helping the Lisbon side to the third position in 1987–88, he played in both legs as they subsequently ousted UEFA Cup holders Bayer 04 Leverkusen in the competition's first round (2–0 on aggregate). The following domestic league brought a sixth place, and the season finished with a 2–1 win against S.L. Benfica in the Portuguese Cup.

In the 1989 summer, Sobrinho moved to Racing Club de France Colombes 92 in France, teaming up with compatriot Jorge Plácido and a young David Ginola. After the club's relegation from Ligue 1, he returned to his country for a third stint with Setúbal, meeting the same fate in his first year.

Sobrinho returned briefly to the top flight with F.C. Paços de Ferreira, moving shortly after to the second level with F.C. Felgueiras. He retired at the age of 36 after playing amateur football with Clube Desportivo Artístico Grandolense, where he teamed up with former Vitória teammate António Aparício.

International career
Sobrinho earned eight senior caps for Portugal, and was picked for the squad that appeared at the 1986 FIFA World Cup in Mexico, being an unused player in an eventual group stage exit.

References

External links

1961 births
Living people
Sportspeople from Setúbal
Portuguese footballers
Association football defenders
Primeira Liga players
Liga Portugal 2 players
Vitória F.C. players
FC Porto players
C.F. Os Belenenses players
F.C. Paços de Ferreira players
F.C. Felgueiras players
Ligue 1 players
Racing Club de France Football players
Portugal under-21 international footballers
Portugal international footballers
1986 FIFA World Cup players
Portuguese expatriate footballers
Expatriate footballers in France
Portuguese expatriate sportspeople in France